Claus Jørgensen may refer to:

Claus Jørgensen (racewalker) (born 1974), Danish race walker
Claus Bech Jørgensen (born 1976), Danish footballer